Sefidar (also Romanized as Sefīdār) is a village in Kiskan Rural District, in the Central District of Baft County, Kerman Province, Iran. At the 2006 census, its population was 65, in 16 families.

References 

Populated places in Baft County